Laura Melissa Sánchez Navarro (born 31 December 1993) is a Colombian female badminton player.

Achievements

BWF International Challenge/Series
Women's Singles

 BWF International Challenge tournament
 BWF International Series tournament
 BWF Future Series tournament

References

External links
 

1993 births
Living people
Colombian female badminton players
Competitors at the 2010 South American Games
21st-century Colombian women